This is a list of protected areas of Nova Scotia.

National Parks
National parks of Canada are protected natural spaces throughout the country that represent distinct geographical regions of the nation. Under the administration of Parks Canada, a government branch, national parks allow for public enjoyment without compromising the area for future generations, including the management of Canadian wildlife and habitat within the ecosystems of the park. There are two formal national parks in Nova Scotia, with one managed as a reserve.
 Cape Breton Highlands National Park 
 Kejimkujik National Park - this park is composed of two sections. The main park is inland, with a seaside adjunct for day use only located near Liverpool.
 Sable Island National Park Reserve

Canadian Heritage Rivers
The Canadian Heritage Rivers System is a program administered by the federal, provincial and territorial governments to conserve river heritage.
 Shelburne River
 Margaree River-Lake Ainslie River System

National Wildlife Areas
A National Wildlife Area is a conservation status for a geographical region in Canada that restricts most human activities on that region. However, land use permits may be issued "for activities that are compatible with conservation". These areas are managed by the Canadian Wildlife Service.
 Boot Island National Wildlife Area* (1.44 km²)
 Chignecto National Wildlife Area* (4.10 km²)
 John Lusby National Wildlife Area* (10.20 km²)
 Sand Pond National Wildlife Area (5.32 km²)
 Sea Wolf Island National Wildlife Area (0.41 km²)
 Wallace Bay National Wildlife Area (5.83 km²)

National Migratory Bird Sanctuaries
Protected areas administered by Canadian Wildlife Service
 Big Glace Bay Lake (240 ha)
 Kentville (200 ha)
 Port L'Hebert (350 ha)
 Port Joli (280 ha)
 Sable River (260 ha)
 Amherst Point (429 ha)
 Sable Island (2350 ha)
 Haley Lake (100 ha)

Provincial Parks

Provincial Wilderness Areas
 there were 68 wilderness areas in Nova Scotia.  They are regulated by the Wilderness Areas Protection Act under the responsibility of Nova Scotia Environment and are areas where resource extraction, development, use of vehicles and similar activities are prohibited. Hunting, trapping and fishing are permitted.
 Alder Grounds Wilderness Area
 Boggy Lake Wilderness Area
 Bonnet Lake Barrens Wilderness Area
 Bowers Meadows Wilderness Area
 Canso Coastal Barrens Wilderness Area
 Clattenburgh Brook Wilderness Area
 Cloud Lake Wilderness Area
 Economy River Wilderness Area
 Eigg Mountain-James River Wilderness Area
 French River Wilderness Area
 Gabarus Wilderness Area
 Gully Lake Wilderness Area
 Jim Campbells Barren Wilderness Area
 Lake Rossignol Wilderness Area
 Liscombe River Wilderness Area
 Margaree River Wilderness Area
 McGill Lake Wilderness Area
 Middle River Wilderness Area
 North River Wilderness Area
 Ogden Round Lake Wilderness Area
 Pollets Cove-Aspy Fault Wilderness Area
 Portapique River Wilderness Area
 Scatarie Island Wilderness Area
 Ship Harbour Long Lake Wilderness Area
 Sugarloaf Mountain Wilderness Area
 Tangier Grand Lake Wilderness Area
 Terence Bay Wilderness Area
 The Big Bog Wilderness Area
 Tidney River Wilderness Area
 Tobeatic Wilderness Area
 Waverley–Salmon River Long Lake Wilderness Area
 White Lake Wilderness Area

Provincial Nature Reserves
 there were 70 nature reserves in Nova Scotia. They are  ecological sites regulated by the Special Places Protection Act, an Act which also protects archaeological, historical and palaeontological sites. They are areas of special natural ecosystems, plant and animal species, features and natural processes. They are areas that provide educational or research field areas but where recreation is restricted.
 Abraham Lake
 Bornish Hill
 Duncans Cove
 Great Barrens and Quinan Lakes
 MacFarlane Woods
 Panuke Lake
 Ponhook Lake
 Quinns Meadow
 River Inhabitants
 Roman Valley
 Rush Lake
 Sloans Lake
 Spinneys Heath
 Sporting Lake
 Washabuck River

Provincial Protected Beaches

 Aulds Cove Beach
 Ballantyne Cove Beach
 Bartletts Beach
 Bayfield Beach
 Beach Meadows Beach
 Beatty Marsh Beach
 Big Pond Beach
 Black Point Beach
 Bramber Beach
 Bridgeport Beach
 Cape Jack Beach
 Carters Beach
 Catalone Gut Beach
 Chance Harbour Beach
 Cherry Hill Beach
 Cheverie Beach
 Christies Beach
 Church Point Beach
 Collindale Beach
 Conrods Beach and Lawrencetown Beach
 Cooks Cove Beach
 Crescent Beach
 Dominion Beach
 Dunns Beach and Monks Head Beach
 Fancys Beach
 Florence Beach
 Fox Island Main Beach
 Fox Point Beach
 Framboise Beach
 Gabarus Beach
 Glace Bay Beach
 Green Bay Beach
 Hadley Cove Beach
 Half Island Beach
 Hampton Beach
 Harrington Beach
 Hirtles Beach
 Inverness Beach
 Iona Beach
 Isaels Cove Beach
 Jersey Cove Beach
 Johnstons Pond Beach
 Kingsburg Beach
 Larry's River Beach
 Lily Pond Beach
 Linwood Beach
 Little Dyke Beach
 Livingstone Cove Beach
 Lower Cove Beach
 Lower Debert Beach
 Lower East Chezzetcook Beach
 Lower Half Island Cove Beach
 Lower Ardoise Beach
 Mahoneys Beach
 Main-A-Dieu Beach
 Majors Point Beach
 Malcolm Cove Beach
 Malignant Cove Beach
 Margaree Harbour Beach
 McCormacks Beach
 Meisners Beach
 Merigomish Beach
 Middle Harbour Beach
 Noonans Beach
 North Bay Beach
 North Harbour Beach
 Partridge Island Beach
 Point Michaud Beach
 Pomquet Beach
 Pondville Beach
 Port Greville Beach
 Port Hood Beach 
 Port Morien Beach
 Queensport Beach
 Ragged Harbour Beach
 Riverside Beach
 Rockey Bay Beach
 Sand Beach
 Sand Point Beach
 Sand River
 Sandy Bay Beach
 Schooner Beach
 Scots Bay Beach
 St. Catherines River Beach
 The Hawk Beach
 Tor Bay Beach
 West Apple River Beach
 Westhaver Beach

Provincial Game Sanctuaries
 Blandford
 Brule Point
 Chignecto
 Hackmatac Lake
 Liscomb Game Sanctuary
 Martinique Beach
 Melbourne Lake
 Shubenacadie
 Spectacle Island Game Sanctuary
 Sunnybrea
 Upper Clements
 Waverley

Provincial Wildlife Management Areas
 Abercrombie
 Antigonish
 Debert
 Dewey Creek
 Eastern Shore Islands
 Hibernia
 Maccan River
 Manganese Mines
 Minas Basin
 Pearl Island
 Scatarie Island
 Shubenacadie
 Tobeatic

Private Protected Areas
Private Protected Areas are owned by the Nova Scotia Nature Trust, the Nature Conservancy of Canada, the Nova Scotia Bird Society and the Bowater Mersey Paper Company.

See also
 List of provincial parks in Nova Scotia
 List of National Parks of Canada
 List of Canadian provincial parks
 List of parks in the Halifax Regional Municipality

References

External links
 Parks Canada official site
 Nova Scotia Provincial Parks official site
 HalifaxTrails.ca - Halifax Parks and Protected Areas

Nova Scotia
Protected areas